Särna (Elfdalian: Sjär’n) is a locality situated in Älvdalen Municipality, Dalarna County, Sweden with 719 inhabitants in 2010.

History
The two parishes Särna and Idre were originally part of Norway but were occupied by an expedition of Swedish peasants from Älvdalen in 1644. The 1645 Treaty of Brömsebro was ambiguous regarding the status of the parishes, but when the exact path of the border was to be decided in 1751 Norway accepted a border west of Idre and Särna.

In 1971 the three municipalities Särna, Idre (which itself had been split off from Särna in 1916) and Älvdalen were amalgamated to form the present municipality of Älvdalen.

Riksdag elections

Climate
Särna has a continentally-influenced subarctic climate with mild summers and cold winters. The cold extremes in winter are associated with the high altitude and being the Scandinavian spot farthest from the sea. This in turn also contributes to high diurnal temperature variation and significant frost has been recorded in all months of the year.

References

External links

Populated places in Dalarna County
Populated places in Älvdalen Municipality
Former Norwegian populated places